Antonio Quarantotto (1897 – 1987) was an Italian freestyle swimmer who competed in the 1920 Summer Olympics.

In 1920 he was a member of the Italian relay team which finished fifth in the 4 x 200 metre freestyle relay competition. He also participated in the 400 metre freestyle event and in the 1500 metre freestyle competition but in both he was eliminated in the first round.

References

External links
Antonio Quarantotto's profile at Sports Reference.com
Report on Italian Olympic swimmers 

1897 births
1987 deaths
Olympic swimmers of Italy
Swimmers at the 1920 Summer Olympics
Italian male freestyle swimmers